Caleb Landry Jones (born December 7, 1989) is an American actor and musician, known for his roles as Banshee in X-Men: First Class, Jeremy Armitage in Get Out, Red Welby in Three Billboards Outside Ebbing, Missouri, Ty Carter in The Outpost, Jeff in Finch,  and Martin Bryant in Nitram. His accolades include a Cannes Film Festival Award for Best Actor and a AACTA Award for Best Actor in a Leading Role for his performance in Nitram.

Early life
Jones was born in Garland, Texas, the son of Patrick and Cindy Jones. As a child, his family relocated to the nearby city of Richardson, where he was raised, and where he later met Robert Hudson and formed the experimental folk rock band, Robert Jones. After finding some success as an actor, Jones relocated to Los Angeles to further pursue his career in film.

Career
After some small, sometimes uncredited roles in such popular films as No Country for Old Men and Superbad, Jones began to receive work in television, appearing in Friday Night Lights as Jimmy Adler and in Breaking Bad as Louis. Jones then had supporting roles in The Last Exorcism, released in 2010, and X-Men: First Class, released in 2011. The following year saw the release of Contraband, the English-language remake of award-winning Icelandic film Reykjavík-Rotterdam, and Byzantium, both of which featured Jones in supporting roles. That year, he had his first starring role in Antiviral, the feature-film debut from writer–director Brandon Cronenberg, the son of Canadian horror director David Cronenberg.

Jones has continued to appear in supporting roles in both independent and mainstream films. In 2017, he appeared in American Made, The Florida Project, Get Out, and Three Billboards Outside Ebbing, Missouri. The latter three films received nominations at the 90th Academy Awards; the latter two were both nominated for Best Picture. In 2021, he starred as Australian mass-murderer Martin Bryant in Justin Kurzel's Nitram, which earned Jones the Cannes Film Festival Award for Best Actor.

Jones released his debut studio album, The Mother Stone, on May 1, 2020. It was recorded in Los Angeles and released through the Brooklyn-based Sacred Bones Records.

Discography

Albums

Singles

Filmography

Film

Television

References

External links

 

1989 births
Living people
21st-century American male actors
American male film actors
Cannes Film Festival Award for Best Actor winners
Male actors from Texas
Outstanding Performance by a Cast in a Motion Picture Screen Actors Guild Award winners
People from Plano, Texas
American male television actors